Fatal Sky (a.k.a. Project Alien) is a 1990 science fiction thriller film. The script was alternately known as No Cause for Alarm, Deadfall and Vanished in its initial preproduction stages. It was an American/ British/ Australian/ Yugoslavian co-production. The movie was not theatrically released and went straight to video.

Plot
Prior to crashing, the pilot of a military plane radios about seeing many lights in the sky. NATO tries to quash the story, but two famous newsmen (George Abbott and Jeff Milker) decide to investigate the story, with the aid of a female pilot named "Bird" McNamara. They discover the area around the crash site is extremely desolate and discover the presence of a mysterious disease. Strange sores begin to appear on members of the local population and the bodies of animals are found mutilated. What is the military covering up?

Cast
 Michael Nouri as Jeff Milker
 Maxwell Caulfield as George Abbott
 Darlanne Fluegel as "Bird" McNamara
 Derrin Nesbitt as Arthur Corbin
 Charles Durning as Col. Clancey
 Ray Charleson as Dr. Bannister
 Sebastian Allen as Beggs
 Ena Begovic as Mrs. Sumner
 Janez Vajevec as Mr. Sumner

References

External links

1990 films
1990s science fiction thriller films
Films set in Norway
Films set in Croatia
Films set in Zagreb
1990s English-language films
Films with screenplays by David Peoples
Australian science fiction thriller films
Films directed by Frank Shields
1990s Australian films